Fusheng is a town under the administration of Jiangbei District, Chongqing, China. , it has four residential neighborhoods and two villages under its administration:
Neighborhoods
Miaoba Community
Xiangyun Community
Fusheng Road Community
Shihexi Community

Villages
Shimiao Village
Huashan Village

Transport
The town is served by Fusheng railway station. It will be served by the Phase 2 of Line 4.

References 

Jiangbei District, Chongqing
Township-level divisions of Chongqing